Ricardo Velazco (born May 26, 1993) is an American professional soccer player.

Club career

Youth, college and amateur
Velazco spent two years with the Real Salt Lake AZ Academy before beginning his college career at Cal State San Bernardino.  In his only season with the Coyotes, he made 14 appearances and tallied six goals and one assist.  After his freshman year, he transferred to the University of Louisville.  In his first year with the Cardinals, he made 20 appearances and recorded seven goals and nine assists on his way to being named First Team All-American Conference and First Team and First Team All-Midwest Region.  In 2014, he made 22 appearances and recorded six goals and five assists.

Velazco also played in the Premier Development League with FC Tucson. He was named PDL Young (U21) Player of the Year and was selected to the All-League and All-Western Conference Teams in 2014.

Professional
On March 7, 2015, Velazco signed a professional contract with Real Monarchs SLC, a USL affiliate club of Real Salt Lake.  He made his professional debut on March 23 in a 0–0 draw with LA Galaxy II. Fast forward several months, Velazco was rewarded with a first team contract after two outstanding seasons with the Real Monarchs and signed a professional contract with Real Salt Lake on September 6, 2016 making him the first ever player in Real Salt Lake History to move up through the ranks from the Real Salt Lake Academy to the Real Monarchs and finally to Real Salt Lake. On March 4, 2017, Velazco made his MLS debut while being subbed on against Toronto FC. On May 13, 2017, Ricardo made his first start for Real Salt Lake while playing against New England Revolution in Foxborough, Massachusetts. In total, Velazco played 9 games over the course of 254 minutes, while registering 5 shots and 1 shot on goal in the 2017 MLS season.

Isidro Metapán
Velazco signed with top flight Primera División side Isidro Metapán for the Clausura 2018 tournament. Velazco scored two goals in a 2–4 defeat against Municipal Limeño in the Estadio Jose Ramon Flores, in January 2018.

Legal Issue
Velazco was charged with unlawful sexual activity with a minor, a third-degree felony punishable by up to five years in prison.
a year later, the district attorney announced that Velazco would plead guilty to the reduce charge of sexual battery.
On April 16, 2018, Velazco was sentenced to 45 days in jail, 24 months of probation, and suspended fine of $2,500.

References

External links
Louisville Cardinals bio

1993 births
Living people
People from Casa Grande, Arizona
Sportspeople from the Phoenix metropolitan area
Soccer players from Arizona
American soccer players
Association football forwards
Cal State San Bernardino Coyotes men's soccer players
Louisville Cardinals men's soccer players
FC Tucson players
Real Monarchs players
Real Salt Lake players
A.D. Isidro Metapán footballers
FC Arizona players
USL League Two players
USL Championship players
Major League Soccer players
Salvadoran Primera División players
American expatriate soccer players
American expatriate sportspeople in El Salvador
Expatriate footballers in El Salvador
Homegrown Players (MLS)